Nick Odore (born 24 February 1965) is a Kenyan boxer. He competed in the men's welterweight event at the 1992 Summer Olympics.

References

External links
 

1965 births
Living people
Kenyan male boxers
Olympic boxers of Kenya
Boxers at the 1992 Summer Olympics
Sportspeople from Nairobi
Commonwealth Games medallists in boxing
Commonwealth Games silver medallists for Kenya
Boxers at the 1990 Commonwealth Games
Welterweight boxers
Medallists at the 1990 Commonwealth Games